In enzymology, a diaminohydroxyphosphoribosylaminopyrimidine deaminase is an enzyme that catalyzes the chemical reaction

2,5-diamino-6-hydroxy-4-(5-phosphoribosylamino)pyrimidine + H2O  5-amino-6-(5-phosphoribosylamino)uracil + NH3

Thus, the two substrates of this enzyme are 2,5-diamino-6-hydroxy-4-(5-phosphoribosylamino)pyrimidine and H2O, whereas its two products are 5-amino-6-(5-phosphoribosylamino)uracil and NH3.

This enzyme belongs to the family of hydrolases, those acting on carbon-nitrogen bonds other than peptide bonds (specifically in cyclic amidines).  The systematic name of this enzyme class is 2,5-diamino-6-hydroxy-4-(5-phosphoribosylamino)pyrimidine 2-aminohydrolase. This enzyme participates in riboflavin metabolism.

Structural studies

References

 

EC 3.5.4
Enzymes of known structure